Marcos Urbina Blancas (born April 15, 1985) is a defender currently playing for the club Monarcas Morelia in the Primera División de México.

He made his debut with Morelia on February 18, 2006, as Monarcas defeated Tecos UAG by a score of 3–1.

External links
 

1985 births
Living people
Liga MX players
Atlético Morelia players
C.F. Mérida footballers
Association football defenders
Footballers from Michoacán
Mexican footballers